Loricaria holmbergi is a species of catfish in the family Loricariidae. It is native to South America, where it is known only from Argentina, with its type locality reportedly being within the San Francisco River basin in Argentina's Jujuy Province. The species reaches 11.8 cm (4.6 inches) in standard length and is believed to be a facultative air-breather.

References 

Loricariidae
Fish described in 2005